The slaty-capped shrike-vireo (Vireolanius leucotis) is a species of bird in the family Vireonidae. It is found in Bolivia, Brazil, Colombia, Ecuador, French Guiana, Guyana, Peru, Suriname, and Venezuela. Its natural habitats are subtropical or tropical moist lowland forests and subtropical or tropical moist montane forests.

References

External links
Image at ADW

slaty-capped shrike-vireo
Birds of the Amazon Basin
Birds of the Guianas
slaty-capped shrike-vireo
Taxonomy articles created by Polbot